The Scottish play and the Bard's play are euphemisms for William Shakespeare's Macbeth. The first is a reference to the play's Scottish setting, the second a reference to Shakespeare’s popular nickname. According to a theatrical superstition, called the Scottish curse, speaking the name Macbeth inside a theatre, other than as called for in the script while rehearsing or performing, will cause disaster. On top of the aforementioned alternate titles, some people also refer to the classical tragedy as Mackers for this reason. Variations of the superstition may also forbid quoting lines from the play within a theatre except as part of an actual rehearsal or performance of the play.

Because of this superstition, the lead character is often referred to as the Scottish King or Scottish Lord. Lady Macbeth is often referred to as the Scottish Lady or Lady M. However, one of the most popular traditions among Shakespeare-specific actors allows "Macbeth" in reference to the character. Nonetheless, many call the pair "Macb" and "Lady Macb".

Origins
The traditional origin is said to be a curse set upon the play by a coven of witches, angry at Shakespeare for using a real spell. One hypothesis for the origin of this superstition is that Macbeth, being a popular play, was commonly put on by theatres in financial trouble, or that the high production costs of Macbeth put theatres in financial trouble, and hence an association was made between a production of Macbeth and theatres going out of business.

Cleansing rituals
When the name of the play is spoken in a theatre, tradition requires the person who spoke it to leave, perform traditional cleansing rituals, and be invited back in. The rituals are supposed to ward off the evil that uttering the play's name is feared to bring on.

The rituals include turning three times, spitting over one's left shoulder, swearing, or reciting a line from another of Shakespeare's plays. Popular lines for this purpose include, "Angels and ministers of grace defend us" (Hamlet 1.IV), "If we shadows have offended" (A Midsummer Night's Dream 5.ii), and "Fair thoughts and happy hours attend on you" (The Merchant of Venice, 3.IV). A more elaborate cleansing ritual involves leaving the theatre, spinning around and brushing oneself off, and saying "Macbeth" three times before entering again. Some production groups insist that the offender may not re-enter the theatre until invited to do so, therefore making it easy to punish frequent offenders by leaving them outside.

A portrayal of the ritual occurs in the 1983 film The Dresser, in which Sir is the offender, and Norman, his dresser, officiates over the propitiation.

The cleansing rituals have been parodied numerous times in popular culture, including in Blackadder, Slings and Arrows, The Simpsons, The West Wing, and Make It Pop. For example, in the Blackadder episode "Sense and Senility", a parody ritual performed by two actors involves slapping each other's hands pat-a-cake fashion with a quickly-spoken ritual ("Hot potato, orchestra stalls, Puck will make amends"), followed by tweaking the other person's nose. In Slings and Arrows, a guest director mocks the superstition by saying the word "Macbeth" onstage, spins around, and falls off on her third spin, resulting in an injury that takes her out of commission for the rest of the season. On The Simpsons, the core five are invited into a performance by Ian McKellen (in Scottish attire, clearly in the title role). The family keeps saying the title, which only makes more bad luck strike the actor, including lightning striking him and the "" falling from the signage (leaving the "").

Patrick Stewart, on the radio program Ask Me Another, asserted "if you have played the role of the Scottish thane, then you are allowed to say the title, any time anywhere."

Historical mishaps
Further instances include the Astor Place Riot in 1849, injuries sustained by actors at a 1937 performance at The Old Vic that starred Laurence Olivier, Diana Wynyard's 1948 accidental fall, and burns suffered by Charlton Heston in 1954.

English actor Harold Norman was mortally wounded in a sword fight during a performance of Macbeth at London’s Repertory Theatre on 30 January 1947. He died in hospital 3 weeks later. 

On 2 December 1964 a fire burned down the D. Maria II National Theater in Lisbon, Portugal. At the time, the play being shown was Macbeth.

In 1980, a production of Macbeth at The Old Vic starring Peter O'Toole, often referred to as Macdeath, was performed. It was reviewed so badly that the theatre company disbanded shortly after the play.

Mishaps on the set of his film Opera led director Dario Argento to believe that the film had been affected by the Macbeth curse; the opera being performed within the film is Verdi's Macbeth.

In 1988, Bulgarian singer, coach and translator Bantcho Bantchevsky committed suicide during a nationally broadcast matinee of Giuseppe Verdi's opera Macbeth. He propelled himself backwards from a balcony railing at New York's Metropolitan Opera House, Lincoln Square.

Ari Aster, writer and director of Hereditary, said that during filming, "Alex Wolff told me not to say the name of William Shakespeare's Scottish play out loud because of some superstitious theater legend. I smugly announced the name, and then one of our lights burst during the shooting of the following scene."

At the 94th Academy Awards, Chris Rock congratulated Denzel Washington on his performance in The Tragedy of Macbeth, saying the name of the Scottish play aloud in the Dolby Theatre. Moments later, Rock was slapped by Will Smith after making a joke about Smith's wife, Jada Pinkett Smith. Viewers, including playwright Lynn Nottage, quickly took to social media to joke that Rock had suffered the curse of the Scottish play.

See also
 Curse of Scotland, a nickname for the nine of diamonds playing card

Notes

External links
 Review: Curse of the Play Review of a newspaper article on the superstitions about Macbeth.
 Supernatural on Stage: Ghosts and Superstitions of the Theater
 Macbeth: The Male Medusa
 

Scottish plays
Macbeth
Curses
Euphemisms
Plays set in Scotland
Scottish popular culture
Superstitions